The Battle of Kernstown may refer to one of two battles during the American Civil War, both fought in the general vicinity of Kernstown, Virginia:

 First Battle of Kernstown in 1862
 Kernstown I Confederate order of battle
 Kernstown I Union order of battle
 Second Battle of Kernstown in 1864
 Kernstown II Confederate order of battle
 Kernstown II Union order of battle

See also 
 Kerns (disambiguation)